Australia has one of the world's richest carnivorous plant floras, with around 187 recognised species from 6 genera.

Species
The following list is derived from Australian Carnivorous Plants (2012) by Greg Bourke and Richard Nunn. It notably excludes the genus Stylidium, whose members may be considered to be protocarnivorous or carnivorous because the glandular trichomes that cover the scape and flower can trap, kill, and digest small insects with protease enzymes produced by the plant.

Aldrovanda (1 species)
Aldrovanda vesiculosa

Byblis (8 species; endemic)
Byblis aquatica
Byblis filifolia
Byblis gigantea
Byblis guehoi
Byblis lamellata		
Byblis liniflora
Byblis pilbarana
Byblis rorida

Cephalotus (1 species; endemic)
Cephalotus follicularis

Drosera (117 species)
Drosera aberrans
Drosera adelae	
Drosera allantostigma
Drosera andersoniana
Drosera androsacea
Drosera arcturi
Drosera auriculata 
Drosera banksii
Drosera barbigera
Drosera binata	
Drosera brevicornis
Drosera broomensis
Drosera browniana
Drosera bulbigena
Drosera bulbosa
Drosera burmannii
Drosera buubugujin		
Drosera caduca		
Drosera callistos
Drosera capensis		
Drosera citrina
Drosera closterostigma
Drosera darwinensis
Drosera derbyensis
Drosera dichrosepala	
Drosera dilatato-petiolaris
Drosera echinoblastus
Drosera eneabba
Drosera erythrogyne
Drosera erythrorhiza
Drosera falconeri
Drosera fimbriata
Drosera fulva
Drosera gibsonii
Drosera gigantea	
Drosera glanduligera
Drosera grievei
Drosera hamiltonii
Drosera hartmeyerorum
Drosera helodes
Drosera heterophylla
Drosera hookeri
Drosera huegelii
Drosera humilis
Drosera hyperostigma
Drosera indica
Drosera intricata 	
Drosera kenneallyi
Drosera lanata		
Drosera lasiantha
Drosera leioblastus	
Drosera leucoblasta
Drosera leucostigma
Drosera lowriei
Drosera macrantha
Drosera macrophylla
Drosera mannii
Drosera marchantii
Drosera menziesii
Drosera microphylla
Drosera microscapa
Drosera miniata
Drosera modesta	
Drosera monticola
Drosera moorei 
Drosera myriantha
Drosera neesii		
Drosera nitidula
Drosera occidentalis
Drosera omissa
Drosera orbiculata
Drosera ordensis	
Drosera oreopodion
Drosera paleacea
Drosera pallida
Drosera paradoxa
Drosera parvula
Drosera patens
Drosera pedicellaris
Drosera peltata
Drosera petiolaris
Drosera platypoda
Drosera platystigma
Drosera porrecta
Drosera praefolia
Drosera prolifera
Drosera prostrata	
Drosera prostratoscaposa
Drosera pulchella
Drosera purpurascens
Drosera pycnoblasta
Drosera pygmaea	
Drosera radicans
Drosera ramellosa
Drosera rechingeri
Drosera roseana
Drosera rosulata	
Drosera rupicola
Drosera salina
Drosera sargentii
Drosera schizandra
Drosera schmutzii
Drosera scorpioides
Drosera sewelliae
Drosera spatulata		
Drosera spilos
Drosera stelliflora
Drosera stolonifera	
Drosera stricticaulis
Drosera subhirtella
Drosera subtilis
Drosera sulphurea		
Drosera tubaestylis
Drosera walyunga
Drosera whittakeri
Drosera zigzagia
Drosera zonaria

Nepenthes (4 species)
Nepenthes mirabilis
Nepenthes parvula
Nepenthes rowaniae
Nepenthes tenax

Utricularia (59 species)
Utricularia antennifera
Utricularia arnhemica
Utricularia aurea
Utricularia australis
Utricularia beaugleholei
Utricularia benthamii
Utricularia bifida
Utricularia biloba
Utricularia caerulea	
Utricularia capilliflora
Utricularia cheiranthos
Utricularia chrysantha
Utricularia circumvoluta
Utricularia dichotoma
Utricularia dunlopii
Utricularia dunstaniae
Utricularia fistulosa
Utricularia foveolata
Utricularia fulva
Utricularia georgei
Utricularia gibba			
Utricularia hamiltonii
Utricularia helix
Utricularia holtzei
Utricularia inaequalis
Utricularia involvens
Utricularia kamienskii
Utricularia kenneallyi
Utricularia kimberleyensis
Utricularia lasiocaulis
Utricularia lateriflora		
Utricularia leptoplectra
Utricularia leptorhyncha
Utricularia limosa
Utricularia menziesii	
Utricularia minutissima
Utricularia muelleri
Utricularia multifida
Utricularia odorata
Utricularia paulineae
Utricularia petertaylorii
Utricularia quinquedentata
Utricularia rhododactylos
Utricularia sandersonii		
Utricularia simmonsii
Utricularia simplex
Utricularia singeriana
Utricularia stellaris
Utricularia subulata
Utricularia tenella
Utricularia terrae-reginae		
Utricularia tridactyla
Utricularia triflora
Utricularia tubulata
Utricularia uliginosa
Utricularia uniflora
Utricularia violacea
Utricularia volubilis
Utricularia westonii

See also
 Carnivorous plants of New Zealand

References

Further reading
 Clayton, C.H. 1998. Carnivorous Plants in Victoria, Australia. Triffid Park, Australia.
 Clayton, C.H. 2003. Carnivorous Plants in New South Wales, Australia. Triffid Park, Australia.
 Clayton, C.H. 2003. Carnivorous Plants in Tasmania, Australia. Triffid Park, Australia.
 Clayton, C.H. 2005. Carnivorous Plants in South Australia, Australia. Triffid Park, Australia.
 Clayton, C.H. 2005. Sub-Carnivorous Plants in Australia. Triffid Park, Australia. 
 Erickson, R. 1968. Plants of Prey in Australia. Lamb Publications, Perth.
 Lowrie, A. 1987. Carnivorous Plants of Australia. Volume 1. University of Western Australia Press, Nedlands.
 Lowrie, A. 1989. Carnivorous Plants of Australia. Volume 2. University of Western Australia Press, Nedlands.
 Lowrie, A. 1998. Carnivorous Plants of Australia. Volume 3. University of Western Australia Press, Nedlands.